is a Japanese women's professional shogi player ranked 2-kyū.

Early life and becoming a women's professional shogi player
Kamada was born in Toride, Ibaraki on June 24, 2008. She learned how to play shogi from her father when she was six years old, subsequently began attending a local shogi school 
operated by shogi professional  as a third-grade elementary school student. Under Ishida's guidance, she entered the Tōkai branch of the Japan Shogi Association's training group system as a fourth-grade elementary school student, and qualified for women's professional status as a second-grade junior high school student after being promoted to training group B2 in April 2022.

Promotion history
Kamada's promotion history is as follows.

 2-kyū: May 1, 2022

Note: All ranks are women's professional ranks.

References

External links
 ShogiHub: Kamada, Mirei

2008 births
Living people
Japanese shogi players
Women's professional shogi players
Professional shogi players from Ibaraki Prefecture